Xipholeptos notoides, commonly known as the southern pygmy squid, is the sole species in the cephalopod genus Xipholeptos. The species was originally classified as Idiosepius notoides. The southern pygmy squid is native to the southwestern Pacific Ocean, off southern and eastern Australia. It inhabits shallow, inshore waters. It has been recorded off the coasts of New South Wales, South Australia, Tasmania and Victoria.

Females grow to 25 mm in mantle length, while males are not known to exceed 15.8 mm in mantle length. This species occurs in beds of seagrass in bays and inlets where it feeds during the night on small crustaceans such as shrimp. In the daytime they remain hidden within the seagrass, adhering to the leaves of the seagrass using a glue excreted by a gland on the dorsal surface of the body. The females attach the eggs onto seagrass blades, most typically species of the genera Heterozostera and Zostera. There is thought to be a pelagic stage during this species' development.

The type-specimen was collected off Goolwa, South Australia, Australia, and is deposited at the South Australian Museum in Adelaide.

References

Further reading
Eyster, L.S. & L.M. van Camp 2003.   Biological Bulletin (Marine Biological Laboratory, Woods Hole, MA) 205(1), 47–53.
Tracey, S.R., M.A. Steer & G.T. Pecl 2003.   Journal of the Marine Biological Association of the United Kingdom 83, 1297–1300.

External links

GenBank Links for Genetic Information on Idiosepius notoides

Cephalopod genera
Monotypic mollusc genera
Molluscs described in 1921
Taxa named by Amanda Reid (malacologist)